The 1997 Dutch Figure Skating Championships took place between 3 and 5 January 1997 in Groningen. Skaters competed in the disciplines of men's singles and ladies' singles.

Senior results

Men

Ladies

External links
 results

Dutch Figure Skating Championships
Dutch Figure Skating Championships, 1997
1997 in Dutch sport
Sports competitions in Groningen (city)